was a Japanese sprinter. She competed at the 1964 Olympics in the 80 m hurdles and 4 × 100 m relay events and finished fifth in the hurdles, setting her personal best at 10.7 seconds.

Yoda retired shortly after the 1964 Olympics. She committed suicide by hanging at the age of 45. She previously attempted suicide in 1960, after failing to qualify for the 1960 Olympics.

References

1938 births
1983 suicides
Sportspeople from Nagano Prefecture
Japanese female sprinters
Japanese female hurdlers
Olympic female hurdlers
Olympic athletes of Japan
Athletes (track and field) at the 1964 Summer Olympics
Asian Games gold medalists for Japan
Asian Games silver medalists for Japan
Asian Games medalists in athletics (track and field)
Athletes (track and field) at the 1962 Asian Games
Athletes (track and field) at the 1958 Asian Games
Medalists at the 1958 Asian Games
Medalists at the 1962 Asian Games
Japan Championships in Athletics winners
Female suicides
Suicides in Tokyo
Suicides by hanging in Japan
20th-century Japanese women